John Weston (1651–1712), of Ockham, Surrey, was an English politician.

His father, Henry Weston, was also an MP for Surrey and Petersfield.

He was a Member (MP) of the Parliament of England for Guildford in 1689 and for Surrey in 1698, February 1701 and December 1701.

References

1651 births
1712 deaths
English MPs 1698–1700
Members of the Parliament of England for Guildford
English MPs 1689–1690
English MPs 1701
English MPs 1701–1702